Randers Stadium, known as Cepheus Park Randers for sponsorship reasons (formerly BioNutria Park Randers, Essex Park Randers and AutoC Park Randers) is a football stadium, located in Randers, Denmark. It is the home ground of Randers FC.

Rebuilding
Randers Stadion was totally rebuilt in 2005–06. The new stadium was designed by Arkitektfirmaet C. F. Møller, while Rambøll was the engineer and A. Enggaard contractor.

The pitch was also renovated in 2006 installing under-pitch heating, and automatic watering systems.

In October 2007 Randers FC installed a 37-square metre jumboscreen at the top of the North Stand.

Randers Stadium official capacity are 10.300 of which 9.000 are seats.

The north stand was the only stand, not to be renovated in the 2006 rebuild, but in 2012 Randers FC announced that the North Stand would be renovated. The North Stand would be finished in the start of the season 2013–14. The North Stand was designed by Friis & Moltke, while Grontmij was the consultative engineers and Einar Kornerup contractor.

The stadium consists of 4 stands:
Two long-side stands:
The Sparekassen Kronjylland stand (2,697 seats)
The Energi Randers stand (2,407 seats)
Two end stands:
The Marcus stand (1,011 seats and 2,886 standing places)
The North stand (2,400 seats and 400 standing places)

Other activities
In October 2006, the stadium hosted the WUSV 2006 Schutzhund World Championship.

Aerosmith performed at the stadium during their 2007 World Tour on 6 June 2007, with 23,000 people in attendance.

National games
Bionutria Park Randers has never been used as home ground for the Danish national team, but it has been venue of several youth national matches:

See also
 List of football stadiums in Denmark

References

External links

  Essex Park Randers at Randers FC's website

Football venues in Denmark
Randers FC
Randers
Buildings and structures in Randers Municipality